Zapotal is a district of the Nandayure canton, in the Guanacaste province of Costa Rica.

Geography 

Demographics 

For the 2011 census, Zapotal had a population of  inhabitants.

Transportation

Road transportation 
The district is covered by the following road routes:
 National Route 160
 National Route 901
 National Route 902

References 

Districts of Guanacaste Province
Populated places in Guanacaste Province